The Government Arts College, previously known as the Government Arts College for Men, is an autonomous college based in the town of Kumbakonam in Tamil Nadu, India. This college is functioning under Bharathidasan University. The Vice-Chancellor of this University is under the charge of Dr. M. Selvam. Dr. K. Duraiarasan has been the principal of this college since taking charge in the last two years of 2020. He is a former Examination Control Officer of Bharathidasan University and Assistant Director of Tamil Nadu Government's Tamil Internet Education Institute.

History
This college was started as a Provincial School in October 1854 even before the establishment of the Madras University. It became one of the oldest educational institutions to be established in the Madras Presidency of British India. In 1864, it was raised to the status of second-grade college with the affiliated subjects Mathematics, History and Philosophy under the university.

Academic Programmes
The college offers undergraduates and postgraduate programmes in arts and science affiliated to the Bharathidasan University. It has been accredited by NAAC with an A Grade.

Notable alumni
Some of the distinguished alumni of the Government Arts College include Srinivasa Ramanujan, V. S. Srinivasa Sastri, P. S. Sivaswami Iyer , U.V.Swaminatha Iyer.
Robert–Rajasekar , S. Shankar

Miniature sculptures in the campus

External links 
 

Arts colleges in India
Education in Thanjavur district
Educational institutions established in 1854
1854 establishments in India
Colleges affiliated to Bharathidasan University
Academic institutions formerly affiliated with the University of Madras
Kumbakonam